The 1994 Lafayette Leopards football team was an American football team that represented Lafayette College during the 1994 NCAA Division I-AA football season. The Leopards won the Patriot League championship. 

In their 14th year under head coach Bill Russo, the Leopards compiled a 5–6 record. Harrison Bailey and Erik Marsh were the team captains.

The Leopards outscored opponents 230 to 202. Their undefeated (5–0) conference record placed first in the six-team Patriot League standings. 

Lafayette played its home games at Fisher Field on College Hill in Easton, Pennsylvania.

Schedule

References

Lafayette
Lafayette Leopards football seasons
Patriot League football champion seasons
Lafayette Leopards football